Dial Square Football Club is an English football club based in Chertsey, Surrey, England. It was founded as a protest club by fans of the Premier League team Arsenal, who had become disillusioned with the club’s direction under the ownership of the Kroenke Sports & Entertainment group. They play in the Surrey County Intermediate League (Western) Division 1.

History 
When Arsenal were founded in 1886, they played their first match as "Dial Square" before becoming Arsenal F.C. and moving to Highbury. In January 2020, Arsenal fan Stuart Morgan announced the founding of Dial Square as a breakaway club, following protests against and disillusionment with Stan Kroenke’s ownership, as well as perceived poor results. Morgan, a former director of Camberley Town F.C., said that Dial Square was founded following the success of other fan-led phoenix clubs such as AFC Wimbledon and FC United of Manchester. The club announced they had agreed a groundshare agreement with Abbey Rangers F.C. in Addlestone, Surrey for their first season, but stated that their eventual goal would be to move the club to a purpose built ground in Woolwich, where Arsenal were originally founded, and to eventually reach the English Football League.

Despite initial plans to apply for entry into the Combined Counties Football League, they eventually joined the Guildford & Woking Alliance League for their first league campaign in 2020–21. Burgundy was adopted as colour of the club’s home shirt in reference to Arsenal’s original colours, while the sundial and oaks featured in the crest referred to the Royal Oak pub in which Arsenal were originally founded. In April 2021, Dial Square received an increase in membership following protests against the proposed European Super League.

Ground

On 3 April 2022, Dial Square announced it had secured a one-year (with the option to extend) groundshare agreement with Isthmian Football League side, Chertsey Town.

References 

Non-League football
Football clubs in Surrey
Arsenal F.C.
Association football clubs established in 2020
2020 establishments in England
Guildford and Woking Alliance League
Fan-owned football clubs in England